Riverside Symphony is a New York-based professional orchestra founded in 1981 by conductor George Rothman and composer Anthony Korf. The orchestra performs an annual three-concert series at Alice Tully Hall, Lincoln Center and is recognized for programs which emphasize lesser known repertoire. The orchestra provides an ongoing forum for emerging soloists of exceptional promise and has showcased numerous instrumental and vocal talents over its history.

History
Directors George Rothman and Anthony Korf met as students at the Manhattan School of Music during the mid 1970s and formed Riverside Symphony after a 1980 concert at Riverside Church. Numbering some 40 musicians in its core roster, the orchestra draws upon New York City's freelance community for its talent, at times expanding in size to meet the demands of larger works. Since the Symphony's inception, directors George Rothman and Anthony Korf have served as Conductor and Composer-in-Residence respectively.

The orchestra's concerts regularly feature guest soloists from around the world. These have included early career appearances by Carter Brey, Frederic Chiu, Jeremy Denk, Tim Fain, Marc-André Hamelin, Christopher O'Riley, and Shai Wosner. The Symphony has also collaborated with guest narrators Cynthia Nixon, Sam Waterston, and Irene Worth.

Riverside Symphony's curatorial focus has been mainly directed to overlooked corners of the repertory, with a special emphasis on contemporary music. The orchestra has championed such American composers as Andrew Imbrie, Stephen Hartke, George Tsontakis, Mario Davidovsky, and Ricardo Zohn-Muldoon, and European composers Marius Constant, Henri Dutilleux, Guus Janssen, and Robert Suter, among others.

Furthermore, Riverside Symphony's International Composer Reading Program has sought to expand the field of opportunity for living composers worldwide. While several of the readings have been devoted solely to American works chosen from an open competition process, several installations of this project have also focused on works by composers from a designated country, such as France, Norway, or Switzerland.

Recordings
Riverside Symphony appears on seven recordings, one of which was Grammy Award Nominee in 2000. All seven recordings consist of 20th- and 21st-century music, namely works by Mario Davidovsky, Stephen Hartke, Andrew Imbrie, Anthony Korf, Poul Ruders, and Maurice Wright.

Educational programs 
In 1999, Riverside Symphony launched the year-long classroom learning program Music Memory in New York City public schools, and has since grown from a handful of schools to serve thousands of school children annually in all five boroughs. Based on a curriculum from Mighty Music Memory, this nationally recognized program is "designed to promote the love and knowledge of classical music through an in-depth study of sixteen great composers, their lives and their music each year." The program concludes every year with the Music Memory Citywide Finals, held at NYU's Skirball Center for the Performing Arts, in which students "must identify the composition and composer of a piece of classical or jazz music they studied after listening to only a short melodic fragment." Music Memory has been endorsed by the New York City Department of Education's Director of Music Barbara Murray.

Riverside Symphony also coordinates music education programs for adults in conjunction with its concert season. The orchestra's Salon Series provides "behind-the-scenes concert previews" with commentary from Riverside Symphony's directors and musical excerpts from guest musicians and/or orchestra members. Hear Hear!, on the other hand, provides a pre-concert preview performance of the evening's featured contemporary work, borne out of the conviction that "nothing beats repeated listening" when it comes to understanding new music.

References

External links 
Riverside Symphony, official web site
"Marius Constant: Behind The Scenes," video from Riverside Symphony's 2014 release Marius Constant
"2013 Winter Salon," video
"Music Memory Citywide Finals, 2012," video
Artistic Director Anthony Korf, official web site

Musical groups established in 1981
Orchestras based in New York City
1981 establishments in New York City